Watertown is a small city in Carver County, Minnesota, United States, along the South Fork of the Crow River, on the outskirts of the Twin Cities metro area. The population was 4,659 at the 2020 census.

History
Watertown was platted in 1858, and incorporated in 1877. The city took its name from Watertown Township.

Geography

Minnesota State Highway 25 serves as a main route in Watertown.

Demographics

2010 census
As of the census of 2010, there were 4,205 people, 1,564 households, and 1,075 families living in the city. The racial makeup of the city was 95.8% White, 0.3% African American, 0.4% Native American, 0.8% Asian, 0.6% from other races, and 2.1% from two or more races. Hispanic or Latino of any race were 1.7% of the population.

There were 1,564 households, of which 40.0% had children under the age of 18 living with them, 56.1% were married couples living together, 7.8% had a female householder with no husband present, 4.9% had a male householder with no wife present, and 31.3% were non-families. 25.1% of all households were made up of individuals, and 10.8% had someone living alone who was 65 years of age or older. The average household size was 2.65 and the average family size was 3.22.

The median age in the city was 34.3 years. 29.5% of residents were under the age of 18; 7.3% were between the ages of 18 and 24; 30.8% were from 25 to 44; 22.7% were from 45 to 64; and 9.7% were 65 years of age or older. The gender makeup of the city was 49.2% male and 50.8% female.

2000 census
As of the census of 2000, there were 3,029 people, 1,078 households, and 775 families living in the city. The racial makeup of the city was 97.69% White, 0.33% African American, 0.20% Native American, 0.53% Asian, 0.43% from other races, and 0.83% from two or more races. Hispanic or Latino of any race were 1.45% of the population.

There were 1,078 households, out of which 40.3% had children under the age of 18 living with them, 57.3% were married couples living together, 9.7% had a female householder with no husband present, and 28.1% were non-families. 24.1% of all households were made up of individuals, and 11.3% had someone living alone who was 65 years of age or older.  The average household size was 2.71 and the average family size was 3.22.

In the city, the population was spread out, with 29.2% under the age of 18, 8.0% from 18 to 24, 31.2% from 25 to 44, 17.8% from 45 to 64, and 13.9% who were 65 years of age or older.  The median age was 34 years. For every 100 females, there were 92.8 males.  For every 100 females age 18 and over, there were 92.4 males.

The median income for a household in the city was $47,500, and the median income for a family was $56,136. Males had a median income of $37,277 versus $27,083 for females. The per capita income for the city was $18,918.  About 4.4% of families and 6.3% of the population were below the poverty line, including 8.0% of those under age 18 and 9.5% of those age 65 or over.

Notable people
 Monika Czinano – Current basketball player at the University of Iowa; graduated from Watertown–Mayer HS in 2018.
 Harry Elliott – Professional baseball player, graduated from Watertown HS in 1942.
 Matt Janning – Professional basketball player, born in Watertown in 1988.
 Marion Ross – Film and television actress, born in Watertown in 1928.

References

Cities in Carver County, Minnesota
Cities in Minnesota